Rosslyn Joy Noonan  (née Shaw, born 1946) is a New Zealand politician and trade unionist. She was an organiser for several trade unions and the Labour Party and served for a time in local government. Later she served as New Zealand's Human Rights Commissioner.

Biography

Early life
Rosslyn Joy "Ros" Shaw was born in 1946 to journalist parents. Her father was Trevor Shaw, who worked as a reporter for The New Zealand Herald. Much of her early childhood was spent overseas, first in Nigeria and the then in the Belgian Congo before returning to New Zealand and finishing school at Auckland Girls' Grammar. She later married Michael A. Noonan, a prominent New Zealand filmmaker and producer with whom she had two children.

Political career
Noonan joined the Labour Party in her youth and while studying at Auckland University joined the famous Princes Street branch. She was the first in her family to attend university where she studied history and focused on the emergence of trade unions and wrote her MA thesis on the unemployed riots of 1932 during the Great Depression. Her history professor was Michael Bassett, himself later a Labour MP. In the lead up to the  she challenged  MP (and pro-life advocate) Gerry Wall for the Labour Party nomination. She was critical of Wall's members bill to close private abortion clinics, but was unsuccessful in her challenge. She was on the organising committee of the 1975 United Women's Convention, working alongside leading feminist organisers such as Sue Piper, Deidre Milne and Margaret Shields.

In 1980 Noonan unsuccessfully contested the Wellington mayoralty against Michael Fowler. Despite losing the mayoralty, she was elected for two terms as a councillor on a Labour ticket between 1980 and 1986. During her time on the council she led the opposition to proposals to privatise city council housing. Arguing that the provision of low-cost, affordable housing was of enormous benefit to the city which had flow-on benefits to ratepayers. Wellington ended up keeping the state housing, one of the few councils that did so. In 1987 she turned down the offer to be Labour's candidate at the Otari Ward by-election saying she had insufficient time to be both a councillor as well as fulfill her duties with the Royal Commission on Social Policy, to which she had been recently appointed.

Other activities
Noonan was involved with trade unionism and entered the field herself via the Kindergarten Teachers' Association. From there she launched her career with the unions and worked for the New Zealand Educational Institute, including eight years as its national secretary from 1988 to 1996. She then left for a position as the human rights coordinator for Education International, an international teachers' organisation in Brussels.

She later returned to New Zealand in March 2001 to succeed Pamela Jefferies as New Zealand's Human Rights Commissioner. She held that position for over a decade until stepping aside in August 2011. In 2018, she was appointed to head a review panel of the family court system in New Zealand by Justice Minister Andrew Little.

In the 2020 Queen's Birthday Honours, Noonan was appointed a Companion of the New Zealand Order of Merit, for services to human rights.

Publications by Noonan

References

External links
 

1946 births
People educated at Auckland Girls' Grammar School
University of Auckland alumni
New Zealand trade unionists
New Zealand Labour Party politicians
Wellington City Councillors
Living people
Companions of the New Zealand Order of Merit